The 2012 Matsumoto Yamaga FC season sees Matsumoto Yamaga compete in J.League Division 2 for the first time after being promoted from the 2011 Japan Football League. Matsumoto Yamaga are also competing in the 2012 Emperor's Cup.

Players

First team squad
As of March 4, 2012

Mid-season Transfer

 In

 Out

Competitions

J. League

League table

Matches

Emperor's Cup

References

Matsumoto Yamaga FC
Matsumoto Yamaga FC seasons